D'Angelo Brewer (born January 6, 1996) is an American football player.

Early years
Brewer was born in 1996 in Kankakee, Illinois, the son of Samuel Cotton and Keyatta Stampley. He attended Central High School in Tulsa, Oklahoma.

College career
Brewer joined the Tulsa football team in 2014. He gained 837 rushing yards as a sophomore in 2015 and 1,435 as a junior in 2016. On September 24, 2016, he rushed for 252 yards against Fresno State.

As a senior, he gained 262 rushing yards against Louisiana–Lafayette on September 9.  During the 2017 regular season, Brewer ranked fifth among all Division I FBS players with 1,517 rushing yards.

On November 16, 2017, in a game against South Florida, Brewer surpassed Marlon Mack to become the American Athletic Conference's all-time leading rusher, and surpassed Tarrion Adams to become Tulsa's all-time leading rusher.

Statistics

References

External links
 Tulsa bio

1996 births
Living people
American football running backs
Tulsa Golden Hurricane football players
Sportspeople from Tulsa, Oklahoma
Players of American football from Oklahoma
Sportspeople from Kankakee, Illinois